The 1997 Campeonato Nacional Apertura Copa Banco del Estado was the 65th Chilean League top flight tournament, and its champion was Universidad Católica which won its seventh title after defeating Colo-Colo in the championship playoffs final.

Standings

Results

Championship play-off

Top-scorers

References

Sources
 RSSSF Chile 1997
 Diario La Tercera Santiago, Chile July 1997

Primera División de Chile seasons
Chile
Apertura